The Blue Heron Paper Company was a paper mill at Willamette Falls in Oregon City, Oregon, on the southeast bank of the river across from the Willamette Falls Paper Company, the T.W. Sullivan hydroelectric plant, and the Willamette Falls Locks and canal.

In 2021, a portion of the Oregon City mill was demolished by descendants of the people who originally lived, fished, and communed at the waterfall, who are considering how to restore and rehabilitate the riverfront, which has been effectively inaccessible for more than 150 years.  The confederated Tribes of Grande Ronde acquired control of the land in 2019 for $15.25 million, and are now planning a cultural and community center.  Four other tribes cite ancestral connections to the area.  Said Trustee Toby Patrick, "Money makes a huge difference in everything that we do, and it takes us away from who we truly are as Indian people, and how we survived before we had money.  We had each other and thatś how we survived."

References

Oregon City, Oregon
Year of establishment missing